AWHS may refer to:
American Women's Hospitals Service
Archbishop Williams High School
Arvada West High School